Left Bank Outfall Drain is a drainage canal in Pakistan. Built between 1987 and 1997 using funding from the World Bank, the canal collects saline water, industrial effluents and Indus river basin floodwater from more than two million hectares of land of Shaheed Benazirabad, Sanghar, Mirpurkhas and Badin districts located in Nara river basin into the Arabian Sea.

The canal overflowed in 2003 and 2011, causing widespread flooding it was meant to prevent.

Project details

Purpose
LBOD is located in the catchment area of the Old Nara river which is a left bank delta channel of Indus river. Old Nara river streams are used to collect the saline water generated from irrigated lands and the industrial effluents. In the middle reach (i.e. Nara canal) of this river, saline and polluted water flowing into the river are diluted by feeding main Indus river water from Sukkur barrage and supplied by gravity canals for irrigation and industrial needs. The saline water generated from the irrigated lands and the industrial effluents are collected by the LBOD canal network from the lower reaches of the Old Nara river or Puran river to discharge by gravity flow to the sea. Also bore wells are used to pump saline water in to the LBOD or the Old Nara river streams to depress the saline ground water level at safe depth or prevent waterlogging. As most of the cultivated lands are located on the left side of the Indus river, LBOD would be the predominant means of discharging the river salt load to the sea once the Indus river waters are fully put to use  without letting the Indus river water overflow to the sea from the Kotri barrage which is the last barrage across the river. Effective usage of LBOD is crucial to preserve/enhance the soil fertility in lower reaches of Indus basin area or Sind province or Indus River Delta for discharging adequate salt load to the sea.

Location
It starts from Ghotki district, which is located on the Sindh-Punjab border, and flows through the districts on the left bank of River Indus before ending in the Sir Creek of Arabian Sea on Badin's coast.

Capacity
Its designed capacity is 4,500 cusecs The canal's effluent disseminates into Dhoro Puran Outfall Drain (DPOD) with capacity of 2000 cusec and Kadhan Pateji Outfall Drain (KPOD) having capacity of 2500 cusec. The DPOD empties into Shakoor Lake located both in Pakistan and India whereas effluent of KPDO is directly discharged into sea through 41 km long Tidal Link Canal. Drainage capacity of canal has been increased to 9000 cusecs after 2011 floods by de-silting of bed of drain, raising banks up to two feet, repairing damaged hydraulic structures and by clearing vegetative growth.

Concerns

Environmental Impact
The creation of the canal has been said to have a negative impact on wetlands in the area,  especially in India's Great Rann of Kutch area, and by releasing LBOD's salt water into the purposefully built Chotiari Reservoir in Sindh in Pakistan.

See also
 Sir Creek dispute

References 

Drainage basins of Pakistan
Water in Pakistan
Canals in Pakistan